Keijo Henrik Säilynoja (born February 17, 1970 in Vantaa, Finland) is a retired Finnish ice hockey player

Playing career

Jokerit (1988-1998)
Säilynoja started his career for Jokerit in 1988, while the team was playing in Finnish First Division. Jokerit were promoted to SM-liiga in 1989 and Säilynoja had made himself as one of the solid players in Jokerit lineup.

Säilynoja had a reputation for being good at Penalty Shots

Säilynoja played in Jokerit for 10 seasons and won the Finnish Championship four times and finished second once.

SaiPa (1998-2000)
After his 10 years for Jokerit, Säilynoja moved to Lappeenranta and played two seasons for SaiPa.

Espoo Blues (2000-2001)
Säliynoja's final SM-liiga season was with Espoo Blues and he retired from active play in 2001.

After retirement
After his retirement, Säilynoja started working out on Banking business and served as the chairman for Finnish ice hockey Players Association.

In 2008, Säilynoja was named as the General Manager for Jokerit

International career

Säilynoja played 46 games for Finnish national team.

Säilynoja was part of the 1992 World Championship squad which won Silver.

Career statistics

Regular season and playoffs

International

External links
 

1970 births
Living people
Edmonton Oilers draft picks
Finnish ice hockey right wingers
Ice hockey players at the 1992 Winter Olympics
Jokerit players
Olympic ice hockey players of Finland
Sportspeople from Vantaa
SaiPa players